Dumeni Solomon "Jesus" Hawala is a former Namibian lieutenant general. Hawala was the deputy commander of the People's Liberation Army of Namibia before independence. He earned the nickname "Butcher of Lubango" for allegedly running detainee camps of SWAPO opponents in the southern Angolan city of Lubango during the Namibian War of Independence. Upon independence in 1990, Hawala was appointed as Army Commander in the Namibian Defence Force (NDF). In 2000 he replaced Dimo Hamaambo as head of the NDF. He retired in October 2006 and was replaced by Martin Shalli.

References

External links
 Speech by Solomon Huwala
 "Truth and Reconciliation: The Road Not Taken in Namibia" by Paul Conway

Year of birth missing (living people)
People's Liberation Army of Namibia personnel
Namibian military personnel
Living people